Chrismon may refer to:
Chrismon, a Christogram
Chrismon, the Chi Rho monogram  
Signum manus or Chrismon, the medieval practice of signing a document or charter with a special type of monogram or royal cipher
Chrismon, a type of Christmas decoration, such as a Chrismon tree
Chrismon (magazine), a monthly German Lutheran magazine

See also
Chrisma (disambiguation)